Centule (or Centulus;) is a masculine given name common in southern France and northern Spain during the Middle Ages.
Centule I, Count of Astarac (fl. 1212–33)
Centule II, Count of Astarac (fl. 1244)
Centule III, Count of Astarac (fl. 1269–1300)
Centule IV, Count of Astarac (fl. 1331–63)
Centule I, Count of Bigorre (d. 1088)
Centule II, Count of Bigorre (d. 1129)
Centule III, Count of Bigorre (d. 1185)
Centule I, Viscount of Béarn (fl. c. 860s)
Centule II, Viscount of Béarn (d. c. 940)
Centule III, Viscount of Béarn (d. c. 1004)
Centule IV, Viscount of Béarn (d. c. 1058)
Centule V, Viscount of Béarn (d. 1088)
Centule VI, Viscount of Béarn (d. 1134)